Constantine III may refer to:

 Constantine III (Western Roman Emperor), self-proclaimed western Roman Emperor 407–411
 Heraclius Constantine, Byzantine Emperor in 641
 Constans II, Byzantine emperor 641–668, sometimes referred to under this name
 Constantine III of Abkhazia, king of Abkhazia in 898/99–916/17
 Constantine III of Scotland, king of Scotland 995–997
 Patriarch Constantine III of Constantinople (ruled 1059–1063)
 Constantine III of Armenia (ruled 1344–1362)
 Constantine III of Cilicia, Catholicos of the Holy See of Cilicia in 1323–1326
 Constantine III, Prince of Mukhrani (1696–1756), Georgian prince

See also 
 Constantius III